The 1980 Arkansas Razorbacks football team represented the University of Arkansas during the 1980 NCAA Division I-A football season. A bright spot for the Hogs in 1980 was senior punter Steve Cox. He led college football with an average of 46.5 yards per punt. He won Super Bowl XXII with the Washington Redskins. Cox completed one of only six field goals of 60+ yards in NFL history. Running back Gary Anderson was named MVP of the Hall of Fame Classic.

Schedule

Roster

References

Arkansas
Arkansas Razorbacks football seasons
All-American Bowl champion seasons
Arkansas Razorbacks football